Bayerotrochus diluculum, common name the dawn slit shell,  is a species of large sea snail, a marine gastropod mollusk in the family Pleurotomariidae, the slit snails.

Description,
The length of the shell reaches 80 mm.

Distribution
This marine species occurs off central Japan.

References

External links
 To Encyclopedia of Life
 To World Register of Marine Species
 

Pleurotomariidae
Gastropods described in 1979